The 2015–16 Ukrainian Cup was the 25th annual season of Ukraine's football knockout competition. The schedule of games for clubs from the First and Second League was confirmed on 3 July 2015 at a session of the Central Council of the Professional Football League of Ukraine.

Format
Starting with Round of 32 teams were divided equally on seeded and unseeded in relation to the current rating of teams before the start of each stage. Seeded teams are teams that are located in the upper half of the rating, unseeded–in the lower.

Round of 16, quarterfinals and semifinals consist of two legs.

Starting with the Round of 16 and to semifinals, the host teams in the first leg is unseeded team, while in the second leg–seeded.

Team allocation

Distribution

Round and draw dates

Competition schedule

Preliminary round (1/32)

In this round entered 10 clubs from the First League, 14 clubs from the Second League and two representatives from the 2014 Ukrainian Amateur Cup. The round matches were played on 22 July 2015.

Notes:
 The competition allows for the finalists of the Ukrainian Amateur Cup. However the winner of the 2014 Ukrainian Amateur Cup, AF Piatykhatska Volodymyrivka (renamed as FC Inhulets Petrove) joined the PFL. Hence the PFL replaced their vacated spot with the highest ranked team. Since both of the semi-finalists of the Amateur Cup also joined the PFL, of the remaining quarter-finalists, Balkany Zorya was the highest ranked team.

Round of 32

In this round all 14 teams from the 2014–15 Ukrainian Premier League, 5 highest ranking clubs from 2014–15 Ukrainian First League and 13 winners from the Preliminary round enter this stage of the competition which also includes 8 teams from the 2014–15 Ukrainian First League, 4 teams from the 2014–15 Ukrainian Second League and last season's Ukrainian Amateur Cup quarter-finalist. The draw for this round was held on 29 July 2015 at the House of Football in Kyiv.

Round of 16
Ten teams from the Ukrainian Premier League and six teams from the Ukrainian First League qualified for the round. The draw for this round was held on 28 August 2015 at the House of Football in Kyiv.  The round matches were played on 23 September and 27, 28 October 2015.

First Leg

Notes:
 Football Federation of Ukraine allows Helios Kharkiv to move their match venue to the larger OSC Metalist stadium.

Second Leg

The dates for the second leg matches were announced on October 13.

Shakhtar won 9–0 on aggregate.

Zorya won 5–1 on aggregate.

Dynamo won 7–0 on aggregate.

Vorskla won 1–0 on aggregate.

Stal won 3–2 on aggregate.

Volyn won 7–0 on aggregate.

FC Oleksandriya won 3–1 on aggregate.

Dnipro won 5–2 on aggregate.

Notes:
 Originally the match was to be held at Bannikov Stadium but the FFU moved the match to Obolon Arena.

Quarterfinals
Eight teams from the Ukrainian Premier League qualified for the round. The draw for this round was held on 30 October 2015 at the Premier-Liha office. Originally the First Leg matches were scheduled for 3 December but the Premier League rescheduled the matches to be played in the spring (2016).

First Leg

Second Leg 
The dates for the second leg matches were announced on March 18.

Shakhtar won 5–2 on aggregate.

Zorya won 6–1 on aggregate.

Oleksandriya won 2–1 on aggregate.

Dnipro won 7–1 on aggregate.

Notes:
 Change of venue for the first leg as management of both sides agreed to play the first leg in Kyiv.

Semifinals
All four teams that qualified for the round are from the Ukrainian Premier League. The draw for this round was held on 8 April 2016 at the House of Football. During the draw there was identified a host for the final whom will be the winner of Dnipro-Zorya pair.

First Leg

Second Leg 

Zorya won 2–1 on aggregate.

Shakhtar won 3–1 on aggregate.

Final

Top goalscorers
The competition's top ten goalscorers including qualification rounds.

''

Notes

See also 
2015–16 Ukrainian Premier League
2015–16 Ukrainian First League
2015–16 Ukrainian Second League
2015–16 UEFA Europa League

References

External links
 Season planner for 2015–16. Ukrainian Premier League.
 2015–16 season Regulations. Ukrainian Premier League.

Cup
Ukrainian Cup
Ukrainian Cup seasons